The Roman Catholic Diocese of Baie-Comeau (erected 29 May 1882, as the Prefecture Apostolic of Golfe St-Laurent) is a suffragan of the Archdiocese of Rimouski. The organization is based in Baie-Comeau, Quebec.

History
It was elevated as the Vicariate Apostolic of Golfe St-Laurent on 12 September 1905 and as the Diocese of Golfe St-Laurent on 24 November 1945. It became the Diocese of Hauterive in 1960 then the Diocese of Baie-Comeau in 1986, following the fusion of Hauterive and Baie-Comeau in 1982.

Ordinaries
François-Xavier Bossé (1882–1892)
Michel-Thomas Labrecque (1892–1903)
Gustave Maria Blanche, C.I.M. (1905–1916)
Patrice Alexandre Chiasson, C.I.M. (1917–1920), appointed Bishop of Chatham, New Brunswick
Julien-Marie Leventoux, C.I.M. (1922–1938)
Napoléon-Alexandre Labrie, C.I.M. (1938–1956)
Gérard Couturier (1956–1974)
Jean-Guy Couture (1975–1979), appointed Bishop of Chicoutimi, Québec
Roger Ébacher (1979–1988), appointed Bishop of Gatineau-Hull, Québec
Maurice Couture, R.S.V. (1988–1990), appointed Archbishop of Québec
Joseph Paul Pierre Morissette (1990–2008), appointed Bishop of Saint-Jérôme, Québec 
Jean-Pierre Blais (2008–)

Territorial losses

Bibliography

External links

Diocese of Baie-Comeau site (in French)

Baie-Comeau
Baie-Comeau
Baie-Comeau
Organizations based in Quebec
Baie-Comeau